Peter Doroshenko (born 1962 in Chicago, Illinois, United States) is the director at The Ukrainian Museum, New York, New York, United States.

Life and career 
Before his arrival in New York, Doroshenko was the Executive Director at Dallas Contemporary, Dallas, Texas, United States. He has held director and curator positions over the past thirty years, including the Pinchuk Art Centre, Kyiv, Ukraine; Baltic Centre for Contemporary Art, Gateshead, England; SMAK - Stedelijk Museum voor Actuele Kunst, Ghent, Belgium; inova (Institute of Visual Arts), Milwaukee; Contemporary Arts Museum, Houston; and Everson Museum of Art, Syracuse.

In the last twenty-five years, Doroshenko has organized one-person exhibitions including artists: Michaël Borremans, Ross Bleckner, Candice Breitz, Maurizio Cattelan, Francesco Clemente, Dan Colen, Sam Durant, Eric Fischl, Tomoo Gokita, Dominique Gonzales-Foerster, Meschac Gaba, Kendell Geers, Loris Gréaud, Andreas Gursky, Peter Halley, Lonnie Holley, Pierre Huyghe, Ilya and Emilia Kabakov, Luisa Lambri, Ange Leccia, John McCracken, Boris Mikhailov, Renata Morales, Mariko Mori, Philippe Parreno, João Penalva, Richard Phillips, Bojan Sarcevic, Kimsooja, David Salle, Julian Schnabel, Pascal Marthine-Tayou, Juergen Teller, Barthélémy Toguo, Salla Tykka, Sam Taylor-Johnson, Piotr Uklanski, Yelena Yemchuk, and Liu Xiaodong.

Doroshenko has written or contributed to several books and numerous exhibition catalogues on artists' work including: Carlos Rolon, FriendsWithYou, Dora Garcia, Joseph Havel, Uri Tzaig, Adriana Varejão, Erwin Wurm, and Liu Xiaodong. In 2010, he published a monograph on collectors who have constructed their own personal museums entitled, Private Spaces for Contemporary Art, with Rispoli Books, Brussels.

Doroshenko was a visiting lecturer at the Core Program at the Glassell School of Art, Houston, from 1998 to 2006, and at the Universität für Angewandte Kunst, Vienna, from 2004 to 2006. He has also lectured extensively at other post-graduate programs and residencies over the years including: de Ateliers, Amsterdam; Hoger Instituut voor Schone Kunsten, Antwerp; Jan van Eyck Academie, Maastricht; Pavillon/Palais de Tokyo, Paris; and the Whitney Independent Study Program, New York City.

From 1996 until 1998, Doroshenko was a board trustee at the Soros Center for Contemporary Art, Kyiv. In 2002, France awarded Doroshenko with the Chevalier of the Order of Arts and Letters for his work with French artists and post-structuralist theory. In 2007, 2009, and 2017, he was the commissioner for the Ukrainian Pavilion at the Venice Biennale, and in 2010, Doroshenko was co-curator of the Busan Biennale, South Korea. In 2012, Doroshenko was a Brown Foundation research fellow at Maison de Dora Maar, Ménerbes, France.

Bibliography

2018
Eric Fischl, If Art Could Talk. Ed. Peter Doroshenko. Milan: Mousse Publishing, 2018. .
2017
Boris Mikhailov, Parliament. Ed. Peter Doroshenko. Kyiv: Rodovid Press, 2017. .
2016
David Salle, Debris. Ed. Peter Doroshenko. New York: Karma, 2016. .
2014
Piotr Uklanski. Ed. Peter Doroshenko. Milan: Mousse Publishing, 2014. .
2010
Private Spaces for Contemporary Art. Ed. Peter Doroshenko. Brussels: Rispoli, 2010. .
2007
Spank the Monkey. Ed. Peter Doroshenko and Pedro Alonzo. Berlin: Gestalten Verlag, 2007. .

References

External links
 Dallas Contemporary
 D Magazine (2011)

Living people
1962 births
American art curators